The 2009–10 Horizon League men's basketball season marked the 30th season of Horizon League basketball.

Preseason
In the preseason, Butler was the conference favorite - returning all players from their regular season HL championship team.  Butler received all but three first-place votes in the preseason poll of HL coaches, media, and sports information directors.  Wright State received the one first place vote, capturing second in the preseason poll, and defending HL Tournament champion Cleveland State claimed two first place votes, finishing third.  The preseason player of the year was 2009 HL MVP Matt Howard of Butler.  Also in the preseason, one HL player was named to both the John R. Wooden Award preseason candidate list and the Naismith Award preseason candidate list: Gordon Hayward of Butler.

HL Preseason Poll

Preseason All-Horizon

First Team
Matt Howard, Butler
Gordon Hayward, Butler
Norris Cole, Cleveland State
Todd Brown, Wright State
Vaughn Duggins, Wright State

Second Team
Rahmon Fletcher, Green Bay
Shelvin Mack, Butler
Tone Boyle, Milwaukee
Troy Cotton, Green Bay
James Eayrs, Milwaukee

Preseason Player of the Year 
Matt Howard, Butler

Conference awards & honors

Weekly awards
HL Players of the Week
Throughout the conference season, the HL offices name a player of the week.

All-Conference Honors

Tournament honors

Matt Howard of Butler was named the tournament MVP.

External links
HL Official website
Horizon League Network
2009-10 HL Men's Basketball Season Preview

References